Raeren is a municipality of east Belgium located in the Walloon province of Liège. It was part of Germany until the First World War, after which it became part of Belgium. It is one of several towns in eastern Belgium which predominantly speak German.

On 1 January 2006, Raeren had a total population of 10,091. The total area is 74.21 km² which gives a population density of 136 inhabitants per km². The municipality consists of the following sub-municipalities: Eynatten, Hauset, and Raeren proper.

Mathias Cormann, the former Minister for Finance of Australia and current Secretary-General of the OECD, was raised in Raeren.

See also 
 List of protected heritage sites in Raeren
 German-speaking community of Belgium

References